André Gabriello (1896–1975) was a French film actor. A character actor known for his supporting roles, notable appearances included Jean Renoir's Partie de campagne (1936) and Maurice Tourneur's Cecile Is Dead (1944). He was the father of the actress Suzanne Gabriello.

Selected filmography

 Calais-Dover (1931)
 My Heart Is Calling You (1934)
 Divine (1935)
 Partie de campagne (1936)
 Yoshiwara (1937)
 Rasputin (1938)
 The Lafarge Case (1938)
 There's No Tomorrow (1939)
 The Murderer Lives at Number 21 (1942)
 La Main du diable (1943)
 Adrien (1943)
 Cecile Is Dead (1944)
 Majestic Hotel Cellars (1945)
 The Revenge of Roger (1946)
 Roger la Honte (1946)
 The Woman in Red (1947)
 The Murdered Model (1948)
 Night Round (1949)
 Branquignol (1949)
 Millionaires for One Day (1949)
 Scandal on the Champs-Élysées (1949)
 Two Loves (1949)
 Street Without a King (1950)
 Without Trumpet or Drum (1950)
 My Wife Is Formidable (1951)
 Moumou (1951)
 Folie douce (1951)
 Grand Gala (1952)
 Women Are Angels (1952) 
 The Drunkard (1953)
 The Fighting Drummer (1953)
 Faites-moi confiance (1954)
 Leguignon the Healer (1954)
 It's All Adam's Fault (1958)
 The Girls of La Rochelle (1962)
 Your Money or Your Life (1966)

References

Bibliography
 Merigeau, Pascal . Jean Renoir: A Biography. Hachette, 2017.
 Waldman, Harry. Maurice Tourneur: The Life and Films. McFarland, 2001.

External links

1896 births
1975 deaths
French male film actors
French male stage actors
Male actors from Paris